Phthersigena melania is a species of praying mantis in the family Nanomantidae. It is endemic to native to Australia's Northern Territory.

See also
List of mantis genera and species

References
2.   https://bie.ala.org.au/species/urn:lsid:biodiversity.org.au:afd.taxon:a435e19f-d57e-47ba-b8aa-3b1aa3b7e704#

Mantidae
Insects of Australia
Insects described in 1923